Chaiyaphum Pasae was a teenage Lahu human rights activist from Thailand who worked on promoting minority ethnic group rights. He was killed at a military checkpoint in Chiang Dao District of Chiang Mai Province by army soldiers on 17 March 2017. The army insisted that Chaiyaphum had been found trafficking drugs, and was killed by soldiers in self-defence after brandishing a grenade and trying to escape custody, but eyewitness accounts stated that he was unarmed, and was beaten before being shot. The killing sparked disbelief in Thailand, and Human Rights Watch issued a statement calling for the case to be transparently investigated. Despite claiming that their version of events was supported by CCTV footage, the military has so far refused to release the video footage to the public.

Timeline

References

2017 deaths
Killing of Chaiyaphum Pasae
Killing of Chaiyaphum Pasae
Killing of Chaiyaphum Pasae
Chaiyaphum Pasae
Chaiyaphum Pasae
Chaiyaphum Pasae